Adolph L. "Whitey" Schafer (1903August 31, 1951) was an American photographer known for his pin-ups and glamour photography. Born in Salt Lake City, Utah, Schafer grew up in California and began working in the movies in 1921. He took still photos of movie stars for several studios, including Columbia and Paramount. Schafer was killed by an explosion on a yacht in 1951.

Early life and education 
Adolph L. Schafer was born in 1903 in Salt Lake City, Utah. His parents moved to California when he was six months old. He went to high school in Hollywood, California, and attended art school at some point.

Career 

Schafer began working in the film lab of Paramount Pictures in 1921. He also worked for Thomas H. Ince's studio, Cecil B. DeMille's studio, RKO-Pathé, and Columbia Pictures, where he headed the photography department as of 1938.

In 1943, and as of 1948, Schafer was the director of still photography at Paramount Pictures. A 1943 profile of Schafer, published during World War II, emphasized his role as a pin-up and glamour photographer, referring to a fictitious serviceman abroad:He burns for one of those works to whistle over—a pin-up portrait of flowing hair, parted lips, shining shoulders and langorous look. And Whitey and the most beautiful women in the world oblige by turning out glamor art on the double run since the wartime cry for star photographs has rocketed 100 per cent by actual studio count.A 1947 profile described Schafer's role as "to photograph hundreds of glamour queens wearing about as much clothes  as normally serves the gun crew on a battleship".

One of Schafer's techniques was the use of "canned sex", a mix of petroleum jelly with "the oil that forms on top of liquid theatrical makeup", which he would put on women's shoulders to reveal "china doll highlights". According to Schafer, "canned sex" worked better than cold cream. He believed that women did not look beautiful in the morning because their eyes were not fully open at that time. His favorite photographic subject was Marlene Dietrich. He wrote a book called Portraiture Simplified, published by Ziff Davis.

In a parody of the Hays Code, Schafer's 1940 photograph Thou Shalt Not depicts a sex worker, dead policeman, and liquor.

Personal life 
Schafer loved silk scarves: he reportedly owned 365, one for each day of the year. His nickname came from his light blond hair. He was close friends with the actor William Boyd.

He died at Puget Sound Naval Memorial Hospital on August 31, 1951, from injuries caused by a yacht explosion in Bremerton, Washington. He was survived by his wife, Mabel, and 22-year-old son, Wayne.

Publications

Notes

Sources

Further reading

External links 

 

1903 births
1951 deaths
20th-century American photographers
Accidental deaths in Washington (state)
American portrait photographers
Columbia Pictures people
Paramount Pictures
People from Salt Lake City
Photographers from Los Angeles